Menstrupedia comic is a guide to educate people around the world, particularly in India, on menstruation. It was started by Aditi Gupta and her now husband, Tuhin Paul. Menstrupedia aims to help people understand the process of puberty in women and men, in order to destroy myths around menstruation and normalise the biological process.

Background 
When Aditi Gupta attained puberty at the age of 12, she found that menstruation is a taboo topic in India. She had to follow Indian traditional customs that implied that a menstruating person was impure, and although her family was well-to-do and educated, she had no access to sanitary napkins because buying them was considered shameful. As she grew up and moved away from her hometown, her perception of menstruation changed. She wished to spread awareness to help girls understand their bodies better and not let society shame them for their biology.

The project started as a computer game, then a board game, developed when Gupta and Paul were students at the National Institute of Design in Gandhinagar; it was originally Gupta's thesis project. The project was launched in 2012 as a prototype pamphlet in Hindi before becoming printed comic books in 2013 following a crowdfunding campaign.

Comic 
Menstrupedia explains menstruation by using relatable characters. The book is designed in a culturally sensitive manner with no objectionable drawings. The content of the book is reviewed by gynecologists for medical accuracy. In the comic, Priya Didi, a doctor, explains puberty to her younger cousin Pinki and to Pinki's friends Jiya and Mira. When Jiya gets her first period during Pinki's birthday party, Priya Didi uses the opportunity to talk to the girls about menstrual health, hygiene and puberty as they ask her questions.

Blog 
The associated blog is a crowd-sourced platform with more than 3000 writers, some as young as 12, and intentionally beautiful illustrations "to flip the narrative". The website also contains Q&A and Learn sections. The online content and the comic have both been reviewed by medical professionals for accuracy.

Popularity 
Since its launch, Menstrupedia has received appreciation for its fact-based portrayal of menstruation. By December 2016 their Facebook page had 37,000 likes, it had 49,000 likes and their Twitter account had 4600 followers.

, the comic had been translated into 16 languages including Nepali and Spanish, and was in use in more than 250 schools in India.

They also gained popularity when they appeared on Shark Tank India Indian version of American series Shark Tank.

References

External links 
 Menstrupedia Comic in English

Indian comics
Menstrual cycle